Neft Daşları is an industrial settlement in Baku, Azerbaijan. The settlement forms part of the municipality of Çilov-Neft Daşları in the Pirallahy raion. A full town on the sea, it was the first oil platform in Azerbaijan, and the first operating offshore oil platform in the world, incorporating numerous drilling platforms. It is featured in Guinness World Records as the world's first offshore oil platform.

The settlement began with a single path out over the water and grew into a system of paths and platforms built on the back of ships sunk to serve as the Neft Daşları's foundation.

Etymology
The settlement was originally named as Chernie Kamni ("Black Stones"), but was later renamed to Neft Daşları ("Oily Rocks"), replacing the allusion to the black colour of oil with a reference to the substance itself.

History

Construction of the settlement

The first large-scale geological study of the area was conducted in 1945–1948. The settlement of Neft Daşları was built after oil was discovered there on 7 November 1949, at  beneath the Caspian Sea and it became the world's first offshore oil platform.

By 1951, the Neft Daşları was ready for production, equipped with all of the infrastructure needed at the time. Drilling platforms were erected, oil tanks installed, and docks with enclosures for ships were built. The first oil from the Neft Daşları was loaded into a tanker in the same year.

In 1952, the systematic construction of trestle bridges connecting the artificial islands was begun. A number of Soviet factories constructed crane assemblies especially for use on the Neft Daşları, along with a crane barge that could carry up to 100 tons of oil. The assemblies were equipped with diesel hammers used to drive piles into the sea floor.

Large-scale construction started on the settlement in 1958, which included nine-story hostels, hotels, cultural palaces, bakery factories and lemonade workshops. In addition, a flyover for vehicular traffic was created.

Post-independence
In November 2009, the settlement celebrated its 60th anniversary. Over the last 60 years, the oilfields of Neft Daşları  have produced more than 170 million tons of oil and 15 billion cubic metres of associated natural gas. According to present-day estimates by geologists, the volume of recoverable reserves is as high as 30 million tons. The oil platforms have gradually fallen into disrepair, and no refurbishment plans are currently underway.

Demography 
The population varies from time to time in the settlement. As of 2008 the platforms have a combined population of about 2,000 men and women, who work in week-long offshore shifts. At one point 5,000 people worked there.

Oil extraction
The oil extraction is carried out from the shallow water portion of the Absheron geological trend.

Accidents
On 4 December 2015, three workers of SOCAR were reported missing after part of the living quarters fell into the sea due to a heavy storm.

In popular culture
 In 2008, a Swiss documentary crew led by film director Marc Wolfensberger filmed "La Cité du Pétrole / Oil Rocks – City above the Sea" in the settlement, which was released in 2009. Vimeo
 Neft Daşları is featured in a scene in the James Bond film The World Is Not Enough (1999).
 Neft Daşları is on the list in the Guinness Book as the oldest offshore oil platforms.

References

External links

 Map of the area
 Photos of Oil Rocks taken in 2013
 Travel guide for Oil Rocks
 English Russia: Oil Stones, A Soviet City in the Middle of the Sea
Link to the film trailer Oil Rocks – City above the Sea

Further reading
 Mir-Babayev M.F. The role of Azerbaijan in the World's oil industry – “Oil-Industry History” (USA), 2011, v. 12, no. 1, pp. 109–123.
 Mir-Babayev M.F. Oil Rocks: the first city on the Caspian Sea – “Reservoir”, Canada, 2012, Volume 39, Issue 4, April, pp. 33–36.

Oil platforms
Coastal construction
Energy in the Soviet Union
Populated places in Baku
Populated places on the Caspian Sea
Seasteading
Energy infrastructure in Azerbaijan
Petroleum industry in Azerbaijan
Azerbaijani inventions